Richard Allen Parfitt (May 13, 1931 – September 6, 2021) was an American college basketball coach. He was head coach for Central Michigan University (CMU) from 1971 to 1985, during which time he led their move from the National Association of Intercollegiate Athletics (NAIA) to NCAA Division I.

Parfitt was born in Gratiot County, Michigan and attended Central Michigan College, where he played basketball and baseball for the Chippewas. Following his graduation in 1953, he became a teacher and high school basketball coach in Laingsburg, Michigan, starting a prep coaching career that would last until 1962 when he returned to his alma mater as an assistant basketball and baseball coach. In 1971 he was named head coach upon the resignation of Ted Kjolhede. Parfitt served as Central Michigan's head coach as the program transitioned from the NAIA to NCAA Division I status, joining the Mid-American Conference (MAC) in the 1972–73 season. Parfitt quickly built a successful program, winning conference titles and earning the school's first two NCAA tournament appearances in 1975 and 1977. In all, Parfitt served 14 seasons as the Chippewas' head coach, compiling a career record of 192–179.

Parfitt died on September 6, 2021, at age 90.

References

See also
Coaching record @ sports-reference.com

1931 births
2021 deaths
American men's basketball coaches
American men's basketball players
Basketball coaches from Michigan
Basketball players from Michigan
Central Michigan Chippewas baseball coaches
Central Michigan Chippewas baseball players
Central Michigan Chippewas men's basketball coaches
Central Michigan Chippewas men's basketball players
College men's basketball head coaches in the United States
High school basketball coaches in Michigan
People from Gratiot County, Michigan